The Haisla Nation is the Indian Act-mandated band government which nominally represents the Haisla people in the North Coast region of the Canadian province of British Columbia, centred on the reserve community of Kitamaat Village. The traditional territory of the Haisla people is situated along the Douglas Channel Region of Kitimat on British Columbia’s north coast, and includes the Kitlope Valley which is rich in natural resources, especially salmon.

Chief and Councillors
Chief Councillor: Crystal Smith
Deputy Chief Councillor: Brenda Duncan
Councillor: Taylor Cross
Councillor: Margaret Grant
Councillor: Willard Grant
Councillor: Raymond (Sonny) Green
Councillor: Lucille Harms
Councillor: Trevor Martin
Councillor: Fred Ringham
Councillor: Harvey Grant
Councillor: Kevin Stewart

Treaty Process/Land Claims

Economic Development
The Haisla band council was described as "decidedly pro-business", supporting a liquefied natural gas (LNG) export project proposed by Apache Canada Ltd., and also gained equity in the BC LNG Export Cooperative.

The Douglas Channel region has been targeted as tidewater for oil and gas  export.

Douglas Channel Energy Partners
In 2004 the Houston-based firm Douglas Channel Energy Partners (DCEP) approached the corporate arm of Haisla band council regarding a potential construction project for a barge-based LNG facility. In 2011, HN DC LNG LP, a limited partnership, was formed for the Haisla Nation to engage in and benefit from western Canada's liquefied natural gas industry. In February 2012, the National Energy Board approved the LNG co-op’s project, "which will export up to 26 million tonnes of the supercooled gas over 20 years, with a single train that can process 125 million cubic feet of gas per day slated to begin operations in 2013."

Enbridge Northern Gateway
Kitimaat Village on Haisla First Nation traditional land would be the location of the Kitimat terminus, where oils sands' raw bitumen would be pumped onto Pacific Ocean supertankers if Enbridge's Northern Gateway pipeline project is approved.

Notable People 

 Eden Robinson - Author

References

External links
Haisla band council homepage

Haisla
First Nations governments in British Columbia